Edward Cole Oatman (June 10, 1889 – November 5, 1973) was a Canadian professional ice hockey player. He was among the elite goal scorers of his era. Among his 32 years (1907–39) playing professional ice hockey, Oatman was named an all-star for ten consecutive seasons by the Pacific Coast Hockey Association (PCHA). He was a star with the Quebec Bulldogs when it won the 1912 Stanley Cup. Oatman played with clubs that won five league championships, and he was a successful coach and captain of five different hockey teams. His brother Russell also played professional ice hockey.

Personal life
Born and raised in Springford, Ontario, Eddie Oatman began playing organized hockey at age ten and continued for the next eight years in youth leagues in his hometown. He moved away to play hockey for a career, and he coached hockey before returning home and becoming a barber. He married Helen Durning in 1921 and had one son, Ted, born in 1922. He died on November 11, 1973, and was interred at the Springford Cemetery, Oxford County, Ontario, where he is buried next to his brother Russell. He was the subject of a Ripley's "Believe It Or Not" article for playing 30 years in professional hockey and is featured on at least two trading cards.

Playing career
Oatman played in 1907 with the Tillsonburg (Ontario) Junior Ontario Hockey Association (OHA) club. The next year he played with the Simcoe Intermediate OHA and, in 1909, he turned professional with the Cleveland, Ohio, club of the International League. The next season, he played on a line with Joe Malone and Jack McDonald for Waterloo of the Ontario Professional Hockey League. In 1911, when Quebec was admitted into the NHA, the three played with the Bulldogs and helped win the 1912 Stanley Cup.

Because of that championship, he and every member of the Bulldogs were offered a contract by PCHA teams. Oatman signed with New Westminster Royals. In the 1914–15 season, he was named to the PCHA All-Star team. The Royals became the Portland Rosebuds and Oatman became the team captain. The following year, he was also its coach and was an All-Star again when the club won the league championship. However, in 1916 the Montreal Canadiens won their first Stanley Cup title, beating Portland three games to two in a best of five playoff series. With Portland's near victory over Montreal, expectations grew for their chances in the 1916–1917 season, but these hopes ended when Oatman enlisted in the Canadian armed forces as part of the 228th Battalion.

When the 228th Battalion secured a franchise in the NHA for the 1916–17 season, Oatman joined the roster. But when the 228th was sent to Europe for military action in the First World War, Oatman was discharged "for special circumstances." The following season Oatman went back to Portland, again as its coach and captain. When the Rosebuds suspended operations, Oatman joined the Victoria Aristocrats as their captain and remained with the team for the next five years. As result of another player's injury, he saw action with the Vancouver Millionaires when they lost the Stanley Cup to the Toronto St. Pats in 1922.

Oatman was traded to the Calgary Tigers in 1923–24. He helped the team win the Western Canada Hockey League title, but were denied a Stanley Cup championship when they again lost to the Montreal Canadiens. From 1924 to 1926, he was the Tigers' coach and captain, leading them to back-to-back championships in 1924 and 1925. Unfortunately, pro hockey collapsed in the West after the 1925–26 season, but he continued to play minor-league hockey. Oatman was the team captain of the Minneapolis, Minnesota, club in the American Hockey Association (AHA) in 1927. Then, for the next three years, he played for the Boston Tigers in the Canadian-American Hockey League (1928–1930), and as their captain led them to the league championship in the 1929. In 1931, he played as captain for the Buffalo Majors in the AHA. He later served as a player-coach in Yorkton, Prince Albert and Saskatoon, Saskatchewan, until his hockey-playing career ended when he was 50.

Playing style

Eddie Oatman was a versatile forward who played most of the positions on the forward line during his hockey career, such as right wing, centre and rover, and he was also occasionally used on defence while playing in the PCHA. Oatman himself claimed that his strongest suit as a hockey player was his stick-handling, and that his greatest weakness was his skating. While playing with Quebec in the NHA in the early 1910s one newspaper also claimed, after Quebec had lost its third straight game, that "Oatman is a great hockey player from the hips up, but from the hips down he reminds one of a truckhorse."

Oatman claimed that he was first taken aback by the speed of his teammates when he first joined the Quebec Bulldogs, and that he realized that he had to improve his skating to keep up with the professional game. At first he did not try to carry the puck, but got rid of it through passing just as soon as it came to him, before he felt that his legs had caught up well enough to manage the speed of the game.

Statistics

Statistics from SIHR at sihrhockey.org, and EliteProspects at eliteprospects.com

References

Notes

External links

1889 births
1973 deaths
Boston Tigers (CAHL) players
Calgary Tigers players
Canadian ice hockey right wingers
Ice hockey people from Ontario
New Westminster Royals players
Portland Rosebuds players
Quebec Bulldogs (NHA) players
Stanley Cup champions
Toronto 228th Battalion players
Vancouver Millionaires players
Victoria Aristocrats players
Victoria Cougars (1911–1926) players